BMT or bmt may refer to:

Transportation 
 Brooklyn–Manhattan Transit Corporation, one of the three original New York City Subway systems
 IATA code and FAA location identifier for Beaumont Municipal Airport, Beaumont, Texas
 Station code for Beaumont (Amtrak station), Beaumont, Texas
 Station code for Bedminster railway station, Bristol, England

Science or technology 
  Bone Marrow Transplantation, Hematopoietic stem cell transplantation
 "best medical therapy", in medicine a term used to point to the best drug treatment according to the current standards
 5-hydroxyfuranocoumarin 5-O-methyltransferase, an enzyme
 Bangladesh Meteorological Department, the national meteorological organization of Bangladesh
 Barcelona Moon Team, a Spanish Google Lunar X-Prize competitor

Other 
 Basic Military Training in some military forces
 BMT Limited, a British consulting company
 Benton MacKaye Trail, a footpath in the Appalachian Mountains
 Biel Mean Time, a decimal time system by watchmaker Swatch
 Blu Mar Ten, a musical group
 "BMT", a track from the 1998 album Sound Museum by Japanese electronic musician Towa Tei
 Biggar Museum Trust, Biggar, Scotland
 Peasant Workers' Bloc (in Romanian Blocul Muncitoresc-Ţărănesc or BMT), a Romanian political party which contested the 1928 and 1931 general elections
 Mechanical biological treatment, sometimes called biological mechanical treatment
 bmt, one of the ISO 639-3 codes for the Iu Mien language, spoken in China, Southeast Asia and by emigrants to the United States
 Blessed Mother Teresa Catholic Secondary School, Scarborough, Ontario, Canada
 BMT (Birlashgan Millatlar Tashkiloti), the Uzbek acronym for the United Nations
 Italian BMT, a sandwich from Subway named after the Brooklyn–Manhattan Transit Corporation

See also
 MQR-13 BMTS (Ballistic Missile Target System), an unguided target rocket developed by the United States Army during the 1960s
 Cobra BMT-2 APC, an Iranian armored personnel carrier